Nymphicula insulalis is a moth in the family Crambidae. It was described by David John Lawrence Agassiz in 2014. It is found in New Caledonia east of Australia.

The wingspan is about 15 mm. Part of the costa of the forewings is brown, but mixed with brownish and whitish from the base to antemedian fascia. The median area is scaled brown. The base of the hindwings is brown and the subbasal fascia is white.

Etymology
The species name refers to the island location of the species.

References

Nymphicula
Moths described in 2014